The Rich Son is a South Korean television series starring Kim Ji-hoon, Kim Ju-hyeon, Lee Kyu-han, and Hong Soo-hyun. The series aired 4 episodes every Sunday from March 25 to October 7, 2018 from 8:50 p.m. to 11:20 p.m. (KST) on MBC TV.

Cast

Main
 Kim Ji-hoon as Lee Kwang-jae
 Kim Ju-hyeon as Kim Young-ha
 Lee Kyu-han as Nam Tae-il
 Hong Soo-hyun as Kim Kyung-ha

Supporting
 Lee Seung-yeon as Nam Soo-hee
 Kim Young-ok as Park Soon-ok
 Yoon Yoo-sun as Park Hyun-sook
 Park Soon-chun as Seo Bok-soon
 Jeong Bo-seok as Kim Won-yong
 Kang Nam-gil as Lee Kye-dong
 Woo Hyun as Choi Hyo-dong
 Yoon Chul-hyung as Nam Soo-hwan
 Lee Chang-yeob as Choi Yong
 Jeon Soo-kyeong as Na Young-ae
 Oh Yoon-hong as Chairman Nam's wife
 Park Jae-jung as Kim Jong-yong
 Shim Eun-jin as Seo Myung-sun
 Kim Min-kyu as Kim Myung-ha
 Elkie Chong as Wang Mong-mong
 Yang Hye-ji as Park Seo-hee

Cameos
 Lee Yong-jin (ep. 7)

Ratings
 In the table below,  represent the lowest ratings and  represent the highest ratings.
 NR denotes that the drama did not rank in the top 20 daily programs on that date.
 N/A denotes that the rating is not known.
 TNmS stop publishing their report from June 2018.

Each night's broadcast is divided into four 35 minute episodes with three commercial break in between.
Episodes 53-56 did not air on June 24 due to coverage of a FIFA World Cup 2018 Group G match between England and Panama.
Only 2 episodes aired on July 1 due to coverage of the FIFA World Cup 2018 Round of 16 match between Spain and Russia.
Episodes did not air on August 19 due to coverage of the 2018 Asian Games and broadcast of the movie The Big Swindle'.
Only 2 episodes will air on August 26 due to coverage of the 2018 Asian Games.
No episodes aired on September 2 due to coverage of the 2018 Asian Games.

Awards and nominations

Notes

References

External links
  

MBC TV television dramas
2018 South Korean television series debuts
Korean-language television shows
2018 South Korean television series endings